The California Digital Library (CDL) was founded by the University of California in 1997. Under the leadership of then UC President Richard C. Atkinson, the CDL's original mission was to forge a better system for scholarly information management and improved support for teaching and research. In collaboration with the ten University of California Libraries and other partners, CDL assembled one of the world's largest digital research libraries.  CDL facilitates the licensing of online materials and develops shared services used throughout the UC system. Building on the foundations of the Melvyl Catalog (UC's union catalog), CDL has developed one of the largest online library catalogs in the country and works in partnership with the UC campuses to bring the treasures of California's libraries, museums, and cultural heritage organizations to the world. CDL continues to explore how services such as digital curation, scholarly publishing, archiving and preservation support research throughout the information lifecycle.

History 

The California Digital Library (CDL) is the eleventh library for the University of California (UC). A collaborative effort of the ten campuses, organizationally housed at the University of California Office of the President, it is responsible for the design, creation, and implementation of systems that support the shared collections of the University of California. Several CDL projects focus on collaboration with other California Universities and organizations to create and extend access to digital material to UC partners and to the public at large.

The CDL was created as the result of a three-year planning process, beginning with the Digital Library Executive Working Group commissioned by Library Council and culminating with the Library Planning and Action Initiative commissioned by the Provost, which involved UC faculty, librarians, and administrators.

On February 7, 2012, CDL partnered with the Public Knowledge Project (PKP), joining several other institutions including Stanford University School of Education and the Faculty of Education at the University of British Columbia, Vancouver. As one of PKP's first official development partners, CDL undertook a review of PKP's Open Journal System, analyzing journal setup, article submission and review, account set up, and publication processes.

Access & Publishing Services 

The Access & Publishing Group, comprising the Publishing and Digital Special Collections (DSC) teams, develops and maintains production services that enable robust access to the unique digital assets of the University of California and beyond. The Publishing team provides the University of California scholarly community with innovative digital publication and distribution opportunities through the development of advanced technologies and creative partnerships. The DSC team supports collaboration between libraries, archives, and museums throughout the State of California to provide access to a world class digital collection that serves an array of end users, from researchers and scholars to students and the general public.

eScholarship 

eScholarship is a suite of open access scholarly publishing services and research tools that enable UC departments, research units, publishing programs, and individual scholars to have direct control over the creation and dissemination of their scholarship. The eScholarship program provides e-print repositories where submissions can be made using a standard web browser. Tools are available to help submit, review, find, and use scholarly information. The program also opens the door for new monographs and journals to be created using existing articles within the repository. Currently, the repository houses over 200,000 scholarly works from 10 major disciplines: Social and Behavioral Sciences, Life Sciences, Physical Sciences and Mathematics, Engineering, Medicine and Health Sciences, Arts and Humanities, Education, Law, Business, and Architecture.

Online Archive of California (OAC) 

The Online Archive of California (OAC), a finding aids database for archival institutions, provides free public access to primary sources, including manuscripts, photographs, artwork, scientific data, through more than 38,000 collection guides and 200,000 digitized images and documents.

Calisphere 

Calisphere is a free website that offers educators, students, and the public access to more than one million primary sources such as photographs, documents, newspapers, political cartoons, works of art, diaries, transcribed oral histories, and other cultural artifacts. These materials reveal the diverse history and culture of California and its role in national and world history. CDL digital collections, plus the collections of over 100 libraries and institutions, can be accessed through this site with the primary purpose of providing free access to historically significant and unique items.

Collection Development and Management 

The Collection Development and Management Program oversees and coordinates shared library collections on behalf of the ten University of California campuses. The program acquires scholarly content, manages UC's mass digitization efforts, organizes and supports shared physical library collections, and is responsible for the system-wide negotiation and licensing of shared digital materials for the UC libraries.

Licensed Resources 

These are the electronic journals, databases, ebooks and other e-resources licensed by CDL on behalf of and in coordination with the ten UC campuses.

Shared Print 

The University of California Libraries' shared print collections consist of information resources jointly purchased or electively contributed by the libraries. Such resources are collectively governed and managed by the University Librarians.

Mass Digitization 

The UC Libraries are digitizing millions of books from their collections through participation in mass digitization projects with Google, the Internet Archive, and the HathiTrust Digital Library. These projects expand the UC Libraries' ability to give faculty, students and the public access to information and support our exploration of new service models.

Shared Cataloging 

The Shared Cataloging Program (SCP) provides catalog records for the University of California campus libraries. Established in January 2000, the program is based at UC San Diego.

Discovery & Delivery 

The focus of the CDL's Discovery and Delivery team is the integration of library services and resources in order to remove barriers between users and content. The goal is to connect faculty, students, and staff with access to the University of California libraries' extensive research collections and beyond to the world's libraries.

AGUA 

AGUA provides key collection data to the Western Regional Storage Trust (WEST) and UC Libraries Shared Print Initiative.

Resource Sharing 

Resource Sharing facilitates consortial borrowing and interlibrary loan from beyond the UC system for UC faculty, students, and staff.

UC Library Search 

UC Library Search is the primary discovery service for the collections of the UC Libraries.

Zephir 

Zephir ingests, stores, and manages bibliographic metadata for HathiTrust.

UC Curation Center (UC3) 

UC3 helps researchers and the UC libraries manage, preserve, and provide access to their important digital assets.

Merritt Repository Service 

Merritt is a repository service from the University of California Curation Center (UC3) that lets the UC community manage, archive, and share its digital content.

EZID 

EZID (easy-eye-dee) creates and manages unique, persistent identifiers for UC researchers. The service currently uses digital object identifiers (DOIs) and Archival Resource Keys (ARKs), which can be provided prior to publication and aid in linking related datasets and articles.

DMPTool 

DMPTool helps researchers create and manage data management plans.  It provides templates that researchers can customize based on their funding source and partner institutions.  It has been noted that the DMPTool is of more use when planning funding applications than in stewarding the data through its lifecycle.

See also 
 List of online image archives
 DataCite
 Digital curation
 Digital library
 Digital preservation
 National Digital Library Program (NDLP)
 National Digital Information Infrastructure and Preservation Program (NDIIPP)
 Google Books Library Project

References

External links 
 

Libraries in California
Photo archives in the United States
University of California
Library publishing
Academic journal online publishing platforms
American digital libraries